Workers' Power is the German section of the Trotskyist League for the Fifth International. It publishes two periodicals: the monthly newspaper Neue Internationale and the theoretical organ Revolutionärer Marxismus.

The origins of the group lie in the Spartacusbund, which existed until 1982. One faction in that organization had contacts with the British group Workers' Power so
Arbeitermacht was founded. These two groups along with the French Pouvoir Ouvrier and the Irish Workers' Group founded the Movement for a Revolutionary Communist International. Soon they found supporters in Austria, Peru, and Bolivia, so the movement renamed itself to League for a Revolutionary Communist International, and after adopting a new program in 2003 it got its present name, League for the Fifth International (LFI).
In 2014 Workers' Power was becoming a leading fraction of the newly funded confraternity of Trotskyist groups in Germany, the New Anticapitalist Organisation (Neue Antikapitalistische Organisation) which was dissolved subsequently in 2016.
In 2017, it changed its name to ArbeiterInnenmacht (see Binnen-I).

The LFI found an independent youth organization called REVOLUTION, which stands in political solidarity with the LFI.
After extended disputes about the role of a communist youth organization, the inner structures, the question of building the workers' party, and the resulting relationship with the LFI, a minority of Revo, who refer to themselves as "independents", formed a tendency called iRevo in the summer of 2006. IRevo, which included a large part of the German section, were expelled in October 2006.

References

External links
Workers Power website
REVOLUTION

League for the Fifth International
Trotskyist organisations in Germany